Gáldar is a town and a Spanish municipality in the north of the island of Gran Canaria in the Province of Las Palmas in the Canary Islands.

The GC-2 motorway passes south of the town. The municipality includes the settlements Puerto de Sardina, San Isidro, Los Quintanas, Barrial and Marmolejos. The main church is dedicated to Saint James.

It holds the Painted cave, a major archaeological site consisting of a remarkable painted cave and an entire pre-Hispanic village visited yearly by over 50,000 people.

Population

Gallery

See also
List of municipalities in Las Palmas

References

External links
www.galdar.es
La Cueva Pintada (The Painted Cave Museum and Archaeological Park)

Municipalities in Gran Canaria